Botola Pro 2, commonly known as Botola 2 (formerly known before as the Groupement National de Football 2), is the second division of the Moroccan football league, behind the Botola, the highest football league in Morocco. It features 16 teams across the country that compete for the top two positions in the competition which at the end of the season allows them promotion to the Botola. Each season as well, the 3 bottom teams are all relegated to the third-level, Division Nationale.

2021–22 clubs

Results

Winners after 1996 
 1995–96 : Hassania Agadir
 1996–97 : MAS Fez
 1997–98 : FUS Rabat
 1998–99 : RS Settat
 1999-00 : RAC Casablanca
 2000–01 : IR Tanger
 2001–02 : Kenitra AC
 2002–03 : MC Oujda
 2003–04 : OC Safi
 2004–05 : Moghreb Tétouan
 2005–06 : MAS Fez
 2006–07 : FUS Rabat
 2007–08 : AS Salé
 2008–09 : FUS Rabat
 2009–10 : JS Kasba Tadla
 2010–11 : CODM Meknès
 2011–12 : Raja Beni Mellal
 2012–13 : Kawkab Marrakech
 2013–14 : Ittihad Khemisset
 2014–15 : IR Tanger
 2015–16 : Chabab Atlas Khénifra
 2016–17 : Rapide Oued Zem
 2017–18 : MC Oujda
 2018–19 : Renaissance Zemamra
 2019–20 : SCC Mohammédia
 2020–21 : OC Khouribga
 2021–22 : Moghreb Tétouan

Relegated teams (from Botola to Botola 2)

See also
Botola
GNFA 1
CAF

References

External links
 Soocerway.com
 GNF 2 – Hailoosport.com (Arabic)
 GNF 2 – Hailoosport.com

 
2
Mor